Kiik is an Estonian language surname meaning "swing". As of 1 January 2021, 219 men and 223 women in Estonian have the surname Kiik. Kiik ranks 252nd for men and 286th for women in the distribution of surnames in the country. The surname Kiik is the most common in Jõgeva County, where 8.85 per 10,000 inhabitants of the county bear the surname. 

Notable people bearing the surname Kiik include:

Heino Kiik (1927–2013), writer 
Kaia Kiik (born 1973), artist and curator
Kalle Kiik (born 1963), chess player
Tanel Kiik (born 1989), politician

References

Estonian-language surnames